Dhani Bhaloth is a village in Buhana tehsil of Jhunjhunu district in Rajasthan. It has a government school and its main economic activity is the cultivation of mustard, wheat, bajra and channa.

There is an annual fair held at the Narsingh temple.

The nearest railway station is  distant at Mahendragarh.

References 

Villages in Jhunjhunu district